William H. Osborne (born March 27, 1960 in Detroit, Michigan, USA), former CEO of Federal Signal Corporation, was replaced by Dennis J. Martin on November 1, 2010.  Prior to September 2008, he was President and CEO of Ford Canada Limited. He is currently Senior Vice President, Manufacturing & Quality for Navistar Corporation a manufacturer of Commercial Trucks. Mr. Osborne also is a current member of the Board of Directors of Quaker Chemical Corporation

He holds a
Bachelor of Mechanical Engineering from GMI Engineering & Management Institute,
an MBA from the University of Chicago and a 
Master of Mechanical Engineering from Wayne State University.

He has spoken out against a proposed trade agreement between Canada and South Korea. He has warned of a cost-cutting agenda for future pay deals.

Notes

External links
Biography
Profile
Interview

1960 births
Living people
21st-century American businesspeople
Kettering University alumni
Wayne State University alumni
University of Chicago Booth School of Business alumni